Vakko is a Turkish fashion company. It produces and retails textiles, leather goods, and accessories. 

Vakko also operates luxury department stores under the Vakko name at Zorlu Center, İstinye Park, Akmerkez, Vadi Istanbul, and  Akasya malls  and on Bağdat Caddesi in Suadiye (Asian side); in Ankara at Atakule and Armada malls, and in Izmir at Hilltown and Istinye Park Izmir malls. It also operates boutiques under the Vakkorama, Vakko Couture, Vakko Wedding, Vakko L'Atelier, and Vakko Home names, as well as Vakko Outlet locations.

In 1962, Vakko's eight-story flagship store on İstiklal Avenue in Beyoğlu was the first modern department store in Turkey. It operated until 2006, when it became a branch of Mango.

History
Vitali Hakko founded the company called "Şen Şapka" in 1934. The name has been changed to Vakko in 1938. The first Vakko store opens in Beyoğlu. In 1998 Vakko Wedding opened for the first time. Vakko designed uniforms for the state companies such as Turkish Airlines and also Turkish National Football team and Turkish Olympics Team.

Vakko Home opened in 2010.

References

External links
 

Retail companies of Turkey
Retail companies established in 1934
Clothing brands of Turkey
Companies based in Istanbul
Turkish brands

Fashion
Turkish companies established in 1934
Clothing companies established in 1934
Department stores of Turkey